Schwyzer is a surname. Notable people with the surname include:

Eduard Schwyzer (1874–1943), Swiss linguist
Hugo Schwyzer (born 1967), American professor and writer
Philip Schwyzer (born 1970), American-British author and educator